Junior John Rorimpandey (born 20 July 1975) better known as Juna Rorimpandey or Chef Juna is a professional cook from Indonesia he is widely known for being a judge in the cooking show MasterChef Indonesia. He has resigned from his position of Executive Chef at Jack Rabbit Restaurant, Jakarta at the end of July 2011 and is currently  still a judge for MasterChef Indonesia.

For 12 years he went abroad, as a chef specializing in Japanese cuisine and French cuisine and in October 2016, Juna opened his first restaurant named "Correla" located on the lobby floor of the Rajawali building Kuningan, South Jakarta.

Early life and career 

When he was young, Juna was a delinquent. After graduating from high school, he went on to study in petroleum engineering at Trisakti University for 3.5 years, but didn't finish his studies because of disciplinary issues. He briefly got into drugs and after Failing to graduate from college in Indonesia, Juna moved to Brownsville, Texas, United States in 1997, and sold his motorbike to pay for schooling there. In America, Juna entered flight school and successfully graduated to get a pilot's license.

While he was studying to get his commercial license, his flight school went bankrupt so he moved to Houston to continue his training. However, due to the 1997 Asian financial crisis, Juna's parents experienced economic difficulties, forcing Juna to find his own money for living expenses.

Juna got into cooking after doing odd jobs to make money, he got a job as a waiter in a traditional Japanese restaurant. After a while, the sushi master at his restaurant offered Juna to be his student. Juna accepted the offer and was willing to be trained from scratch.  Afterwards the restaurant owner promoted Juna to get Permanent Residency in the United States.

In 2002, Juna took over as head chef at the restaurant because the sushi master who trained Juna moved to another restaurant. Then, in 2003, Juna moved to another sushi restaurant in Houston called Uptown Sushi and became Executive Chef there.

After getting bored of Japanese cuisine he moved to a French restaurant, The French Laundry which is known as a restaurant that applies high standards. He also had to learn again from scratch. There he was educated very harshly.

After returning home to Indonesia he served as Executive Chef at Jack Rabbit Jakarta restaurant until 2011. He is also active as a judge on MasterChef Indonesia.

Filmography

Film

TV Show 
 MasterChef Indonesia ( Season 1–10) (RCTI)
 MasterChef MasterClass Ramadan (RCTI)
 Arjuna (Global TV)
 Hell's Kitchen Indonesia (SCTV)
 MasterChef Asia (Lifetime)
 Chef's Table (NET.)
 Dahsyatnya MasterChef Indonesia (RCTI)
 DCODE: The Progressive Project (NET.)
 OK Chef (RCTI)

Commercial

References 

Indonesian chefs
Living people
1975 births
People from Manado